The Plaza de la Concordia, or Zócalo, is a large plaza in Cholula, Puebla, Mexico.

Features
The San Miguel Arcángel Fountain, statue of Benito Juárez, and statue of Miguel Hidalgo y Costilla are installed in the plaza.

References

Cholula, Puebla
Plazas in Mexico